Otto Konrad (born 1 November 1964 in Graz) is a retired Austrian football  goalkeeper.

Club career
Konrad started his professional career with local outfit Sturm Graz, where he stayed 11 years before enjoying a successful period at Austria Salzburg.
 He played in both legs of the 1994 UEFA Cup Final which they lost to Inter Milan.
Also, he scored the goal of the 1994/1995 season against Stahl Linz In 1995, he won the Römer Award in honour of his success.

In 1997, he joined Spanish side Real Zaragoza to become their first goalkeeper but he left them after only one and a half season to return to Austria.

International career
He made his debut for Austria in a May 1989 friendly match against Norway and was a participant at the 1990 FIFA World Cup. He earned 12 caps, no goals scored. His last international was an August 1995 European Championship qualification match against Latvia.

Honours
Austrian Football Bundesliga (3):
 1994, 1995, 1997

External links

References

1964 births
Living people
Footballers from Graz
Association football goalkeepers
Austrian footballers
Austria international footballers
Austrian expatriate sportspeople in Spain
1990 FIFA World Cup players
SK Sturm Graz players
FC Red Bull Salzburg players
Real Zaragoza players
Grazer AK players
Austrian Football Bundesliga players
La Liga players
Expatriate footballers in Spain
Austrian expatriate footballers
Association football goalkeeping coaches